Short hair refers to any haircut with little length. It may vary from above the ears to below the chin. If a man's hair reaches the chin, it may not be considered short. For a woman, however, short varies from close-cropped to just above the shoulders. Different styles of short hair include the bob cut, the crop and the pixie cut.

Maintenance
Short hair is easier to care for than long hair. For this reason, many women cut their hair short to save time and the effort of maintaining it. However, it does take more time to be specifically styled than long hair.

Men
For men in Europe or European-settled areas, having short hair is now generally the norm, despite long hair or wigs having been fashionable at various times in the past (including ancient Sparta, the 18th century, and the 1970s).

In East Asia, the style is in a relativity recent development. Cultures within the Sinosphere generally preserved a tradition of growing out one's hair long without trimming, although it was typically worn tied up.  The Qing dynasty required this to be cut into a queue, but it wasn't until the advent of the European colonial empires and the Republic of China that what is normally thought as short hair became popular for men.

Women
Short hair for women became fashionable in the 1920s. Styles included the bob cut (a blunt cut to the chin or neck and cut evenly all around), the shingle bob (a haircut that was tapered short in the back) and the short crop (cut short in the back and longer hair in front). Women wore longer styles in the 1930s and 1940s, but short hair made a comeback when Audrey Hepburn sported a pixie cut (a very short wispy haircut) in the 1953 film Roman Holiday. Short hair was fairly popular throughout the 60s, but the 70s and 80s favored different hairstyles. It became popular in the 1990s and remains so to this day. There have been other styles, such as the Eton crop (a more extreme take on the short crop), and short layers.

See also
 List of hairstyles

References

External links
 
 

Hairstyles